Lovro Zovko (born 18 March 1981) is a former professional tennis player from Croatia.

Tennis career

Juniors

As a junior Zovko reached as high as No. 9 in the world rankings in 1998 (and No. 10 in doubles).

Pro tour
Early in 2000 and 2001, Zovko reached the doubles final in Umag with Ivan Ljubičić.

In 2007, Zovko made the doubles finals of the Kremlin Cup (Moscow) event with Tomáš Cibulec before losing to Marat Safin and Dmitry Tursunov in the final, 6–4, 6–2.  Zovko reached the 2007 Grand Prix de Tennis de Lyon doubles final with Łukasz Kubot,  losing to Sébastien Grosjean and Jo-Wilfried Tsonga in the final, 6–4, 6–3.

ATP career finals

Doubles: 5 (0–5)

References

External links
 
 
 

1981 births
Living people
Croatian male tennis players
French Open junior champions
Tennis players from Zagreb
Grand Slam (tennis) champions in boys' doubles